Oʻsmat is an urban-type settlement in Jizzakh Region, Uzbekistan. It is the administrative center of Baxmal District.

Population 
The town population in 1989 was 4,662 people.

References

Populated places in Jizzakh Region
Urban-type settlements in Uzbekistan